S. citri may refer to:
 Septoria citri, a fungal plant pathogen
 Spiroplasma citri, a bacterium species and the causative agent of Citrus stubborn disease